The  IEEE Transportation Technologies Award  is a technical field award given for advances in technologies within the fields of interest to the IEEE as applied in transportation systems. This IEEE-level award, was created in 2011 by the board of directors of the IEEE and sponsored by the IEEE Industry Applications Society, IEEE Industrial Electronics Society, IEEE Intelligent Transportation Systems Society, IEEE Microwave Theory and Techniques Society, IEEE Power Electronics Society, IEEE Power & Energy Society, IEEE Vehicular Technology Society. 
The award is given to an individual, a team, or multiple recipients up to three in number.

Recipients of this award receive a bronze medal, a certificate, and an honorarium.

Recipients
The following people have received the  IEEE Transportation Technologies Award :

 2021: Philip T. Krein 
 2020: Markos Papageorgiou
 2019: Hao Huang
 2018: C.C. Chan
 2017: Claire J.Tomlin
 2016: Petros Ioannou
 2015: Robert Dean King
 2014: Linos J. Jacovides

References 

IEEE Transportation Technologies Award